The Rumpler C.X, produced under the company designation Rumpler 8C 14, was a German two-seat observation aircraft. It was developed from the earlier Rumpler 8C 13 prototype by Rumpler in early 1918. The prototype had a similar wing design to the Rumpler C.VII, powered by a  Mercedes D.IVa engine and was later powered by a  Maybach Mb.IVa. The C.X had the highest top speed and service ceiling of all German C-type aircraft and an order was placed for the aircraft in August 1918, but few were built and tested before the war ended.

Specifications

Footnotes

References

 

C.X
Single-engined tractor aircraft
Biplanes
1910s German military trainer aircraft
Aircraft first flown in 1918